Fort A.P. Hill is a training and maneuver center belonging to the United States Army located near the town of Bowling Green, Virginia. The center focuses on arms training and is used by all branches of the U.S. Armed Forces. It is named for Virginia native and Confederate Lieutenant General A. P. Hill. Fort A.P. Hill is one of the U.S. Army installations named for Confederate soldiers to be recommended for renaming by The Naming Commission. Their recommendation is that the post be renamed Fort  Walker. On 5 January 2023 William A. LaPlante, US under-secretary of defense for acquisition and sustainment (USD (A&S)) directed the full implementation of the recommendations of the Naming Commission, DoD-wide.

History

In the spring of 1940, the War Plans Division of the Army General Staff developed a plan to raise a national army of four million men that would allow it to conduct simultaneous operations in both the Pacific and European theaters.

Lieutenant Colonel Oliver Marston, an artillery officer stationed in Richmond, Virginia and acting as an agent of the Third Corps Area commander, made a detailed investigation of the Bowling Green, Virginia area in September 1940. He enthusiastically recommended that the War Department procure the Caroline County site. The result was a maneuver area that contained  and billeting space for 74 officers and 858 enlisted personnel.

Fort A.P. Hill was established as an army training facility on June 11, 1941, pursuant to War Department General Order No. 5. In its first year, the installation was used as a maneuver area for the II Corps and for three activated National Guard divisions from the Mid-Atlantic states. In the autumn of 1942, Fort A.P. Hill was the staging area for the headquarters and corps troops of Major General George S. Patton’s Task Force A, which was part of the Western Task Force of the Allied invasion of French North Africa. During the early years of World War II, the post continued to be a training site for corps and division-sized units. Commencing in 1944, field training for Officer Candidate School and enlisted replacements from nearby Forts Lee, Eustis, and Belvoir was conducted.

In 1952, during the Korean War, Fort A.P. Hill was designated as Camp A.P. Hill and was a major staging area for units deploying to Europe, including the VII Corps Headquarters and the 3rd Armored Cavalry Regiment. The fort was the major center for the Engineer Officer Candidate School, training students from Fort Belvoir during the Vietnam War.

Construction of the U.S. Army Ordnance Corps Explosive Ordnance Disposal training center was completed in July 2011, with the first day of class being October 17, 2011. It is named after Captain Jason McMahon, who died in Afghanistan in 2010. The center provides explosive ordnance disposal advanced technical training and tactical skills education for both officer and enlisted.

The U.S. Army Asymmetric Warfare Group officially opened its $90.1 million Asymmetric Warfare Training Center on January 24, 2014. The  training complex includes a headquarters, barracks, administrative, training and maintenance facilities, an urban training area, a  mobility range, an  known distance range, a light demolitions range and an indoor shooting range. This center focuses on providing joint and combined arms training. All branches of the U.S. Armed Forces train at Fort A.P. Hill, and the installation has also hosted training of foreign allies, ranging from providing support for mobilizations to helping units train for deployment.

Organization 
The fort's garrison currently includes;

 Directorate of Emergency Services
 Directorate of Family and MWR
 Directorate of Plans, Training, Mobilization, and Security
 Regional Training Support Center
 Plans, Analysis and Integration Office
 Directorate of Public Works
 Direcorate of Resource Management
 Installation Safety Office
 Sustainable Range Program

Training

It is used year-round for military training of both active and reserve troops of the U.S. Army, U.S. Navy, U.S. Marine Corps, and U.S. Air Force, as well as Reserve Officers' Training Corps cadets and other government agencies including the Departments of State and Interior, U.S. Customs and Border Protection, and federal, state, and local security and law enforcement agencies.

Boy Scouts of America National Jamborees

The installation hosted the Boy Scouts of America National Scout Jamboree in 1981, 1985, 1989, 1993, 1997, 2001, 2005, and 2010. The number of participants each time included approximately 35,000 Boy Scouts and some 250,000 visitors.  In 2013, the Boy Scouts moved the Jamboree to its new permanent home at Summit Bechtel Reserve high adventure camp in Fayette County, West Virginia.

In the media
An episode of What on Earth?, first shown on Discovery Channel as S8 E1 (8/27/20), features the site in an episode called "Zombietown USA."

References

External links

Wealthy in Heart: Oral History of Life Before Fort A.P. Hill
History of Fort A.P. Hill page
Condensed history of U.S. Army Garrison Fort A.P. Hill

Caroline County, Virginia
Forts in Virginia
Training installations of the United States Army
United States Army posts
Buildings and structures in Caroline County, Virginia
Military installations established in 1941
1941 establishments in Virginia